Vivi Bach (3 September 1939 – 22 April 2013) was a Danish film actress. She appeared in 48 films between 1958 and 1974. Bach was born as Vivi Bak in Copenhagen, Denmark, and died on Ibiza, Spain, where she lived with her husband, the Austrian film actor Dietmar Schönherr.

Selected filmography

 Krudt og klunker (1958)
 Pigen og vandpytten (1958)
 Soldaterkammerater rykker ud (1959)
 We Will Never Part (1960)
 Guitars Sound Softly Through the Night (1960)
 Crime Tango (1960)
 Our Crazy Aunts (1961)
 The Adventures of Count Bobby (1961)
 The Sold Grandfather (1962)
 The Post Has Gone (1962)
 Death Drums Along the River (1963)
 Our Crazy Nieces (1963)
 Bullets Don't Argue  (1964)
 Holiday in St. Tropez (1964)
 Mozambique (1965)
 Love Italian Style (1965)
 Come to the Blue Adriatic (1966)
 The Spy with Ten Faces (1966)
  (1966)
 The Pipes (1966)
  (1966)
 Electra One (1967)
 Love Thy Neighbour (1967)
 Glorious Times at the Spessart Inn (1967)
 Onkel Joakims hemmelighed (1967)
 Assignment K (1967)
  (1969)

References

External links

1939 births
2013 deaths
Danish film actresses
Actresses from Copenhagen
20th-century Danish actresses